Sancho II may refer to:
Sancho II of Pamplona (b. aft. 935–994), King of Pamplona and Count of Aragon (970–994)
Sancho II of Castile (1040–1072), King of Castile (1065–1072) and León (1072)
Sancho II of Portugal (1207–1248), King of Portugal (1223–1248)
Sancho II of Gascony